Mark Wynne Thomas (born 30 January 1977) is an English cricketer. Thomas is a right-handed batsman who bowls right-arm fast-medium. He was born in Norwich, Norfolk.

Thomas made his debut for Norfolk in the 1996 Minor Counties Championship against Cumberland. Thomas played Minor counties cricket for Norfolk infrequently from 1996 to 2008, which included 35 Minor Counties Championship matches and 21 MCCA Knockout Trophy matches. In 2001, he appeared in 3 MCCA Knockout Trophy matches for Cambridgeshire. He made his List A debut for Norfolk against Hampshire in the 1996 NatWest Trophy. He made 3 further List A appearances for the county, the last coming against the Surrey Cricket Board in the 1999 NatWest Trophy. In his 4 List A matches, he scored 35 runs at an average of 8.75, with a high score of 26. As a bowler, Thomas bowled 38.1 overs for the cost of 182 runs, and claiming just the one wicket.

His father, Peter and uncle, David, both played for Norfolk.

References

External links
Mark Thomas at ESPNcricinfo
Mark Thomas at CricketArchive

1977 births
Living people
Cricketers from Norwich
English cricketers
Norfolk cricketers
Cambridgeshire cricketers